Olivia Tennet (born 4 January 1991) is a New Zealand actress and dancer best known in her home country for her role as Tuesday Warner on the nightly medical drama Shortland Street, along with several roles in television and theatre. Outside of New Zealand, she is best known for her roles in The Lord of the Rings: The Two Towers (2002), Power Rangers RPM (2009), and the independent film Blood Punch (2013).

Career
Tennet began taking dance lessons at the age of four years following her older sister into dance, eventually stumbling into acting three years later She made her first major television appearance in the fourth season of Xena: Warrior Princess as the runaway Princess Alesia in the episode "If The Shoe Fits...".

Eventually, Tennet made her way into films. She went on to win the "Best Juvenile Performer" award at the Nokia New Zealand Film and TV Awards in 2000, for her role as Nicole Mitchell in Kids World. She also appeared in Peter Jackson's film adaptation of J. R. R. Tolkien's The Lord of the Rings: The Two Towers as Freda, a young girl of Rohan. She then won "Best Actress" at the Drifting Clouds Short Film Festival for her outstanding performance in the short film Watermark, beating the other adult nominees. The film won "Best Film" at the same awards.

Following this, Tennet became part of the core cast for Maddigan's Quest (2006) as Lilith. She then appeared as Tuesday Warner on Shortland Street for 54 episodes during the 2007 and 2008 seasons. She later portrayed the role of teenage genius Dr. K on Power Rangers RPM, the seventeenth season of the Power Rangers series which premiered in March 2009.

Around this time, Tennet competed in the "Sheilah Winn Shakespeare Competition" with classmate Phoebe Mason (Epsom Girls Grammar School Drama Leader 2008) and did quite well, winning four of fifteen awards. The 5-minute performance included various scenes from Macbeth. Tennet and Mason won a trip to the Globe Theatre in London, July 2009, as part of the Young Shakespeare Company.

Since her appearance on Power Rangers RPM, Tennet has participated in various television shows and theatrical productions in New Zealand. She played the role of nurse Lynne in an Auckland Theatre Company production of Stepping Out in June 2010, followed by the role of the Siren Queen for the Wet Hot Beauties' water ballet show titled Sirens for the Auckland Fringe Festival in February 2011. She also helped choreograph the show.

Later on, Tennet made a television appearance in an episode of The Almighty Johnsons as Delphine in March 2011. She also took the stage as Emilia in Peach Theatre Company's production of Othello in July 2011. She then took on the role of Dorothy in a major theatrical production of The Wizard of Oz based on the 1987 musical produced by the Royal Shakespeare Company at the Civic Theatre in September 2011, earning positive reviews for her portrayal of the character.

Before leaving for the United States, she made an appearance on Underbelly NZ: Land of the Long Green Cloud as Julie Theilman, a courier working for Terry Clark of the Mr. Asia drug syndicate.

After wrapping up on The Wizard of Oz, Tennet moved to the United States to film a low-budget independent feature film titled Blood Punch which also featured many of her co-stars from Power Rangers RPM. The film premiered at the 20th Austin Film Festival in late October 2013 and has won many awards and honors in the film festival circuit since then. While in the United States, she also appeared in a web series and did voiceover work before moving back to New Zealand.

Since then, Tennet appeared in the miniseries When We Go To War and the joint Australia-New Zealand TV series 800 Words, along with various stage and voiceover credits. She also produced her own web series of dance videos titled Dancing in Small Spaces on YouTube and Vimeo. In late 2018, Tennet, along with actors Esther Stephens and Aria Jones, formed a 60's doo-wop trio named The Up-Doos who have begun performing in several local Auckland venues.

In 2020, Tennet reprised the role of Dr. K in two episodes of the second season of Power Rangers Beast Morphers.

Personal life 

Tennet was born in Auckland, New Zealand. Along with her older sister Emma, Tennet also has an older brother, Anton Tennet, who is also an actor based in Melbourne, Australia.

While living in Los Angeles, California, she married fellow New Zealand actor Milo Cawthorne, with whom she has worked several times in the past, most notably on Power Rangers RPM and more recently on Blood Punch. The couple had been living together in Los Angeles since late 2011 before moving back to New Zealand in late 2013 to begin rehearsals for the Auckland production of 360: A Theatre of Recollections (2014). As of June 2016, the couple had separated. Since then, she has been in a relationship with musician Tom Broome with whom she has a son named Alwyn.

Tennet graduated from the Epsom Girls Grammar School in 2008 shortly before appearing on Power Rangers RPM. She began studying speech therapy at the University of Auckland after moving back to NZ with her then-husband and as of July 2019, she graduated with her bachelor’s degree.

Filmography

Film

Television

Voiceover

Music videos

Web series

Stage

Other works

Awards and nominations

References

External links

Olivia Tennet - Johnson & Laird Management
YouTube Channel - OliviaTennet

1991 births
Living people
New Zealand television actresses
New Zealand film actresses
New Zealand stage actresses
New Zealand child actresses
New Zealand soap opera actresses
People from Auckland
People educated at Epsom Girls' Grammar School
Shakespearean actresses
20th-century New Zealand actresses
21st-century New Zealand actresses